Paul Szameitat (19 December 1919 – 2 January 1944) was a German Luftwaffe night fighter ace and recipient of the Knight's Cross of the Iron Cross during World War II.  The Knight's Cross of the Iron Cross was awarded to recognise extreme battlefield bravery or successful military leadership. Paul Szameitat claimed 29 victories, 28 at night.

Awards
 Flugzeugführerabzeichen
 Front Flying Clasp of the Luftwaffe
 Iron Cross (1939)
 2nd Class
 1st Class
 Ehrenpokal der Luftwaffe on 5 June 1943 as Oberleutnant and pilot
 German Cross in Gold (12 December 1943)
 Knight's Cross of the Iron Cross on 6 April 1944 as Hauptmann and Gruppenkommandeur of the I./Nachtjagdgeschwader 3

Notes

References

Citations

Bibliography

External links
TracesOfWar.com

1919 births
1944 deaths
People from East Prussia
Luftwaffe pilots
German World War II flying aces
Luftwaffe personnel killed in World War II
Recipients of the Gold German Cross
Recipients of the Knight's Cross of the Iron Cross
People from Primorsk, Leningrad Oblast
Aviators killed in aviation accidents or incidents in Germany